The Social Sciences and Humanities Research Council of Canada (SSHRC; , CRSH) is a Canadian federal research-funding agency that promotes and supports post-secondary research and training in the humanities and social sciences. It is one of three major federal granting agencies (the others being the Natural Sciences and Engineering Research Council and Canadian Institutes for Health Research) that together are referred to as the "Tri-Council" or "Tri-Agency.

History 
Created by an act of the Parliament of Canada in 1977, SSHRC reports to Parliament through the Minister of Innovation, Science, and Economic Development. SSHRC came into existence on 1 May 1978 under the Social Sciences and Humanities Research Council Act which was passed in an omnibus manner by the government of Pierre Elliot Trudeau.

Governance 
SSHRC creates policy, plans budgets, and directs priorities through a council established by the federal government. The appointed members are a mix of academics and representatives from the industry. They have the role of advising the Minister of Innovation, Science and Economic Development on research policy in the areas of research and scholarship in the social sciences and humanities, with the goal of representing the interests of academic, public and private sectors. Council committees create and oversee SSHRC's programs, determine the distribution of funds and handles the strategies for enacting the councils policies.

President 
Past presidents include André Fortier (1977–?), William E. Taylor (also, William Ewart Taylor Jr), Paule Leduc (June 1988 to March 1994), Lynn Penrod (1994–1997), Marc Renaud (1997–2005), and Chad Gaffield (2006–2014). Ted Hewitt was appointed president of SSHRC in March 2015, and continues to serve as President.

Programs 
SSHRC funding opportunities are available through three programs: Talent, Insight and Connection.

Talent program 
The Talent program is to support students and postdoctoral candidates to become researchers and leaders across society, both within academia and across the public, private and not-for-profit sectors.

The program promotes research skills and assists in the training of highly qualified personnel in the social sciences and humanities. In this way, SSHRC fosters the development of talented and creative people who will become leaders across campuses and communities.

Insight program 
The Insight program is to build knowledge and understanding about people, societies and the world by supporting research excellence in all subject areas eligible for funding from SSHRC. Research and training in the social sciences and humanities provide the foundation for a vibrant, healthy and prosperous society. They build knowledge and understanding about individuals, groups and societies.

The program aims to support and foster excellence in social sciences and humanities research intended to deepen, widen and increase collective understanding of individuals and societies, as well as to inform the search for solutions to societal challenges.

Connection program 
The Connection program is to realize the potential of social sciences and humanities research for intellectual, cultural, social and economic influence, benefit and impact on and beyond the campus by supporting specific activities and tools that facilitate the flow and exchange of research knowledge.

Knowledge mobilization in the social sciences and humanities facilitates the multidirectional flow of research knowledge across academia and society as a whole, in order to inform Canadian and international research, debate, decisions and actions. Those who can benefit from publicly funded research results in the humanities and social sciences - diverse groups of researchers, policy-makers, business leaders, community groups, educators and the media. The program aims to support knowledge mobilization activities such as networking, disseminating, exchanging and co-creating research-based knowledge as an important element of publicly engaged scholarship, and as a means of strengthening research agendas. SSHRC also recognizes that rapidly evolving information and communications technologies provide new opportunities to engage a variety of audiences with an interest and/or involvement in social sciences and humanities scholarship.

A program entitled Canada 150 Connection has been set up for the 150th anniversary of Canada to support activities by post-secondary institutions and researchers that explore the contributions of social sciences and humanities research to Canadian society.

Notable past SSHRC Scholars and Fellows include 
  Nissim Mannathukkaren

Future challenge areas 
In June 2013, SSHRC's governing council endorsed six future challenge areas developed during its Imagining Canada's Future initiative, with a goal of addressing Canada's future societal challenges and meeting future opportunities through social sciences and humanities research.

See also
Canada Foundation for Innovation
Canada Research Chairs Program

References

External links
 
 Research for a Better Life: The Storytellers
 SSHRC Impact Awards
 Canada Excellence Research Chairs Program
 Indirect Costs Program

Federal departments and agencies of Canada
Funding bodies of Canada
Education finance in Canada
Innovation, Science and Economic Development Canada
Government agencies established in 1977
1977 establishments in Canada
Members of the International Science Council